The 1968 Tipperary Senior Hurling Championship was the 78th staging of the Tipperary Senior Hurling Championship since its establishment by the Tipperary County Board in 1887.

Carrick Davins were the defending champions.

On 13 October 1968, Roscrea won the championship after a 2-13 to 3-04 defeat of Thurles Sarsfields in the final at Thurles Sportsfield. It was their first championship title ever.

Results

Final

Championship statistics

Miscellaneous

 Roscrea win their first senior title.

References

Tipperary
Tipperary Senior Hurling Championship